Country Homes is a census-designated place (CDP) in Spokane County, Washington, United States. The population was 5,841 at the 2010 census. The campus of Whitworth University is located in Country Homes.

Geography
Country Homes is located at  (47.745690, -117.417558).

According to the United States Census Bureau, the CDP has a total area of 1.7 square miles (4.4 km2), all of it land.

Demographics

As of the census of 2000, there were 5,203 people, 1,821 households, and 1,161 families residing in the CDP. The population density was 3,066.6 people per square mile (1,181.7/km2). There were 1,930 housing units at an average density of 1,137.5/sq mi (438.3/km2). The racial makeup of the CDP was 91.35% White, 1.36% African American, 1.27% Native American, 1.92% Asian, 0.90% Pacific Islander, 0.73% from other races, and 2.46% from two or more races. Hispanic or Latino of any race were 2.48% of the population.

There were 1,821 households, out of which 29.0% had children under the age of 18 living with them, 48.4% were married couples living together, 12.1% had a female householder with no husband present, and 36.2% were non-families. 27.1% of all households were made up of individuals, and 9.9% had someone living alone who was 65 years of age or older. The average household size was 2.36 and the average family size was 2.83.

In the CDP, the age distribution of the population shows 18.9% under the age of 18, 27.4% from 18 to 24, 20.0% from 25 to 44, 19.0% from 45 to 64, and 14.6% who were 65 years of age or older. The median age was 29 years. For every 100 females, there were 82.8 males. For every 100 females age 18 and over, there were 77.7 males.

The median income for a household in the CDP was $36,630, and the median income for a family was $45,000. Males had a median income of $37,583 versus $23,550 for females. The per capita income for the CDP was $18,514. About 6.6% of families and 11.0% of the population were below the poverty line, including 8.6% of those under age 18 and 4.5% of those age 65 or over.

Transportation

Highway
  - U.S. 2 - to  Newport (north) and Spokane (south)

U.S. 2 passes north–south along the eastern boundary of Country Homes on Newport Highway.

  - U.S. 395 - to  Colville (north) and Spokane (south)

U.S. 395 passes north–south through Country Homes along Division Street.

Public Transit
Country Homes is served by the Spokane area's public transit provider, the Spokane Transit Authority, which runs three fixed-route bus lines through the CDP.

References

Census-designated places in Spokane County, Washington
Census-designated places in Washington (state)